Rhodopteriana rhodoptera is a moth in the family Eupterotidae. It was described by Carl Eduard Adolph Gerstaecker in 1871. It is found in Cameroon, the Democratic Republic of the Congo, Ethiopia, Gabon, Kenya, South Africa, Tanzania and Uganda.

References

Janinae
Moths described in 1871